Eucalyptus amygdalina, commonly known as black peppermint, is a species of flowering plant that is endemic to Tasmania. It is a small to medium-sized tree with rough bark on park of the trunk, smooth grey to brown bark above, lance-shaped to linear adult leaves, oval to club-shaped flower buds, white flowers and cup-shaped to hemispherical fruit.

Description
It has rough, finely fibrous bark on most or all of the trunk and base of the larger branches, smooth greyish bark above.

Taxonomy
Eucalyptus amygdalina was first formally described in 1806 by Jacques Labillardière in his book Novae Hollandiae Plantarum Specimen. The specific epithet (amygdalina) means "almond".

Distribution
Black peppermint is endemic to Tasmania where it is widespread in the drier, north-eastern side of the island, from coastal areas extending well inland to the edges of plateaux where it is part of dry eucalypt forest communities.

See also
List of Eucalyptus species

References

Flora of Tasmania
Endemic flora of Tasmania
Trees of Australia
amygdalina
Myrtales of Australia